Thomas William McNeeley Jr. (February 27, 1937 – October 25, 2011) was a heavyweight boxer in the 1950s and 1960s. He came from Arlington, Massachusetts, and played football for Michigan State University. His son, Peter McNeeley, and father, Tom McNeeley Sr., were also boxers.

Career
Tom McNeeley had his first professional bout at the Norwood Stockcar Arena July 17, 1958. On December 4, 1961, McNeeley challenged Floyd Patterson for the world heavyweight championship, McNeeley's most famous bout. McNeeley was on the November 13, 1961 cover of Sports Illustrated. He later served eight years as the boxing commissioner of the Massachusetts State Boxing Commission.

Death
McNeeley died on October 25, 2011 at the age of 74 of complications from a seizure.

Professional boxing record

|-
|align="center" colspan=8|37 Wins (28 knockouts, 8 decisions, 1 DQ), 14 Losses (5 knockouts, 8 decisions, 1 DQ)
|-
| align="center" style="border-style: none none solid solid; background: #e3e3e3"|Result
| align="center" style="border-style: none none solid solid; background: #e3e3e3"|Record
| align="center" style="border-style: none none solid solid; background: #e3e3e3"|Opponent
| align="center" style="border-style: none none solid solid; background: #e3e3e3"|Type
| align="center" style="border-style: none none solid solid; background: #e3e3e3"|Round
| align="center" style="border-style: none none solid solid; background: #e3e3e3"|Date
| align="center" style="border-style: none none solid solid; background: #e3e3e3"|Location
| align="center" style="border-style: none none solid solid; background: #e3e3e3"|Notes
|-align=center
|Loss
|
|align=left| Curtis Bruce
|MD
|10
|14/06/1966
|align=left| Four Seasons Arena, Walpole, Massachusetts
|align=left|
|-
|Loss
|
|align=left| Boston Jacobs
|PTS
|10
|24/03/1966
|align=left| Portland Exposition Building, Portland, Maine
|align=left|
|-
|Win
|
|align=left| Jean-Claude Roy
|SD
|10
|08/03/1966
|align=left| Lewiston City Hall, Lewiston, Maine
|align=left|
|-
|Win
|
|align=left| Dick Greatorex
|TKO
|7
|12/02/1966
|align=left| Boston Garden, Boston, Massachusetts
|align=left|
|-
|Win
|
|align=left| Marion Connor
|TKO
|9
|13/12/1965
|align=left| Boston Garden, Boston, Massachusetts
|align=left|
|-
|Loss
|
|align=left| Marion Connor
|UD
|12
|15/10/1965
|align=left| Boston Arena, Boston, Massachusetts
|align=left|
|-
|Loss
|
|align=left| José Torres
|UD
|10
|31/07/1965
|align=left| Hiram Bithorn Stadium, San Juan, Puerto Rico
|align=left|
|-
|Loss
|
|align=left| James J Beattie
|KO
|5
|27/03/1965
|align=left| Boston Garden, Boston, Massachusetts
|align=left|
|-
|Win
|
|align=left| Arnie Brower
|TKO
|10
|13/02/1965
|align=left| Boston Garden, Boston, Massachusetts
|align=left|
|-
|Loss
|
|align=left| Thad Spencer
|KO
|5
|09/11/1964
|align=left| Santa Monica Civic Auditorium, Santa Monica, California
|align=left|
|-
|Win
|
|align=left| Hal Carter
|KO
|5
|13/10/1964
|align=left| Woodhouse Arenatorium, North Dartmouth, Massachusetts
|align=left|
|-
|Loss
|
|align=left| Oscar Bonavena
|TKO
|5
|21/08/1964
|align=left| Madison Square Garden, New York City, New York
|align=left|
|-
|Win
|
|align=left| Leslie Borden
|KO
|4
|16/07/1964
|align=left| Burlington, Vermont
|align=left|
|-
|Win
|
|align=left| Don Quinn
|TKO
|4
|25/04/1964
|align=left| Boston Arena, Boston, Massachusetts
|align=left|
|-
|Loss
|
|align=left| Doug Jones
|TKO
|5
|03/02/1964
|align=left| New York Coliseum, New York City, New York
|align=left|
|-
|Win
|
|align=left| Duke Sabedong
|UD
|10
|09/12/1963
|align=left| Boston Garden, Boston, Massachusetts
|align=left|
|-
|Win
|
|align=left| Duke Sabedong
|DQ
|2
|14/10/1963
|align=left| Boston Arena, Boston, Massachusetts
|align=left|
|-
|Win
|
|align=left| Earl Atley
|TKO
|2
|16/09/1963
|align=left| Boston Arena, Boston, Massachusetts
|align=left|
|-
|Win
|
|align=left| Bill Nielsen
|TKO
|8
|17/06/1963
|align=left| Omaha Civic Auditorium, Omaha, Nebraska
|align=left|
|-
|Loss
|
|align=left| Brian London
|PTS
|10
|29/01/1963
|align=left| London Olympia, London
|align=left|
|-
|Loss
|
|align=left| Bob Cleroux
|SD
|10
|14/12/1962
|align=left| Boston Garden, Boston, Massachusetts
|align=left|
|-
|Win
|
|align=left| Billy Tisdale
|TKO
|7
|15/11/1962
|align=left| Mechanics Hall, Worcester, Massachusetts
|align=left|
|-
|Win
|
|align=left| Earl Atley
|TKO
|8
|01/11/1962
|align=left| Mechanics Hall, Worcester, Massachusetts
|align=left|
|-
|Loss
|
|align=left| Don McAteer
|DQ
|6
|08/06/1962
|align=left| Celtic Hall, Totowa, New Jersey
|align=left|
|-
|Loss
|
|align=left| Willie Pastrano
|UD
|10
|01/05/1962
|align=left| Boston Arena, Boston, Massachusetts
|align=left|
|-
|Win
|
|align=left| Don Prout
|UD
|10
|16/03/1962
|align=left| Boston Garden, Boston, Massachusetts
|align=left|
|-
|Loss
|
|align=left| Don Prout
|SD
|10
|22/01/1962
|align=left| Rhode Island Auditorium, Providence, Rhode Island
|align=left|
|-
|Loss
|
|align=left| Floyd Patterson
|KO
|4
|04/12/1961
|align=left| Maple Leaf Gardens, Toronto, Ontario
|align=left|
|-
|Win
|
|align=left| Kitione Lave
|TKO
|3
|21/03/1961
|align=left| Boston Arena, Boston, Massachusetts
|align=left|
|-
|Win
|
|align=left| George Logan
|UD
|10
|20/12/1960
|align=left| Boston Garden, Boston, Massachusetts
|align=left|
|-
|Win
|
|align=left| George Logan
|MD
|10
|15/11/1960
|align=left| Boston Garden, Boston, Massachusetts
|align=left|
|-
|Win
|
|align=left| Jim Wyley
|TKO
|3
|17/10/1960
|align=left| Rhode Island Auditorium, Providence, Rhode Island
|align=left|
|-
|Win
|
|align=left| Ulli Ritter
|TKO
|8
|16/05/1960
|align=left| Boston Arena, Boston, Massachusetts
|align=left|
|-
|Win
|
|align=left| Tunney Hunsaker
|TKO
|9
|12/04/1960
|align=left| Boston Arena, Boston, Massachusetts
|align=left|
|-
|Win
|
|align=left| Willi Besmanoff
|PTS
|10
|14/03/1960
|align=left| Boston Garden, Boston, Massachusetts
|align=left|
|-
|Win
|
|align=left| George Logan
|TKO
|4
|01/01/1960
|align=left| Madison Square Garden, New York City, New York
|align=left|
|-
|Win
|
|align=left| Louis Jones
|TKO
|4
|27/11/1959
|align=left| Madison Square Garden, New York City, New York
|align=left|
|-
|Win
|
|align=left| Louis Jones
|UD
|6
|31/07/1959
|align=left| Madison Square Garden, New York City, New York
|align=left|
|-
|Win
|
|align=left| Cardell Farmos
|KO
|3
|27/06/1959
|align=left| Hill Arena, West Yarmouth, Massachusetts
|align=left|
|-
|Win
|
|align=left| Jeff Holmes
|KO
|2
|25/05/1959
|align=left| Arcadia Ballroom, Providence, Rhode Island
|align=left|
|-
|Win
|
|align=left| Charlie Lopes
|KO
|1
|02/05/1959
|align=left| Boston Arena, Boston, Massachusetts
|align=left|
|-
|Win
|
|align=left| Leo Pinto
|KO
|2
|21/04/1959
|align=left| Woodrow Wilson Hall, New Bedford, Massachusetts
|align=left|
|-
|Win
|
|align=left| Joe Louis Brown
|KO
|2
|17/03/1959
|align=left| Boston Garden, Boston, Massachusetts
|align=left|
|-
|Win
|
|align=left| Art Mayorga
|KO
|3
|30/01/1959
|align=left| Madison Square Garden, New York City, New York
|align=left|
|-
|Win
|
|align=left| Bobby Halpern
|PTS
|4
|19/12/1958
|align=left| Madison Square Garden, New York City, New York
|align=left|
|-
|Win
|
|align=left| Mossie Walker
|KO
|1
|28/11/1958
|align=left| Madison Square Garden, New York City, New York
|align=left|
|-
|Win
|
|align=left| Eddie Allen
|KO
|3
|17/10/1958
|align=left| Madison Square Garden, New York City, New York
|align=left|
|-
|Win
|
|align=left|Eddie Walker
|KO
|1
|06/10/1958
|align=left| Mechanics Hall, Boston, Massachusetts
|align=left|
|-
|Win
|
|align=left|Temple Jones
|KO
|3
|14/08/1958
|align=left| Mark's Stadium, Fall River, Massachusetts
|align=left|
|-
|Win
|
|align=left| Bob Harris
|KO
|5
|04/08/1958
|align=left| Arena, Norwood, Massachusetts
|align=left|
|-
|Win
|
|align=left| Richie Norden
|KO
|2
|17/07/1958
|align=left| Arena, Norwood, Massachusetts
|align=left|
|}

See also
 Peter D. Fuller, who served as McNeeley's manager, 1957 – c. 1961

References

External links
 

Boxers from Massachusetts
1937 births
2011 deaths
People from Arlington, Massachusetts
American male boxers
Michigan State Spartans football players
Heavyweight boxers
Sportspeople from Middlesex County, Massachusetts